Gary G. Bennett Jr. is the Bishop-MacDermott Family Professor of Psychology & Neuroscience, Global Health and Medicine at Duke University. In November 2022, he was appointed Dean of Trinity College of Arts and Sciences, effective February 2023.

Education and career 
Bennett earned a Ph.D and MA in clinical health psychology at Duke University and a bachelor's degree from Morehouse College.

In July 2018, Bennett was appointed Vice Provost of Undergraduate Education at Duke University. He is the founding director of the Duke Global Digital Health Science Center. He co-founded Crimson Health Solutions, acquired by Health Dialog in 2007. In 2014, he co-founded Scale Down, a digital obesity treatment startup acquired by Anthem in 2017. He also founded Coeus Health, a provider of health APIs.

He is the former President of the Society of Behavioral Medicine and a fellow of the Association for Psychological Science.

Bennett developed the interactive obesity treatment approach (iOTA); and his research program designs, tests, and disseminates digital obesity treatments.

Recognition 
Bennett is a fellow of the Association for Psychological Science and is an elected member of the Academy of Behavioral Medicine Research and Behavioral Medicine Research Council.

Notes 

Duke University School of Medicine faculty
Living people
Morehouse College alumni
Duke University alumni
Healthcare company founders
Fellows of the Association for Psychological Science
Obesity researchers
Year of birth missing (living people)